Francesco Schiavone (born 3 March 1954) is a member of the Camorra, the Caserta organized crime syndicate, and the head of the Casalesi clan from Casal di Principe in the province of Caserta. He has been dubbed Sandokan after a popular 1970s television series starring Kabir Bedi because of his thick, dark beard.

Early career
He started his criminal career as a driver and bodyguard of Umberto Ammaturo. His first arrest was in 1972 for illegal possession of firearms. Schiavone was involved in several bloody clan wars of the Camorra in which dozens of people were killed in the Naples area in the past decades. He sided with Antonio Bardellino, the founder of the Casalesi clan and prominent leader of the Nuova Famiglia, and Mario Iovine against the Nuova Camorra Organizzata (NCO) of Raffaele Cutolo. When the NCO was defeated, an internal feud broke out between Bardellino and Iovine. Schiavone, together with Francesco Bidognetti and Vincenzo Di Falco sided with Iovine.

A new feud broke out between the Di Falco clan and Iovine-Schiavone. In December 1990, De Falco allegedly betrayed them making a tip-off to police against Schiavone and Francesco Bidognetti and the latters ordered Vincenzo Di Falco's killing on February 2, 1991 in Casal di Principe. In retaliation Nunzio Di Falco killed Mario Iovine on 6 March 1991, in Portugal. While in custody the Di Falco clan was defeated. As the old bosses, such as Bardellino and Iovine, and potential younger leaders like Bidognetti and De Falco disappeared, he became the boss of the clan in the 1990s, being the strongest and most cunning of his generation.

Fugitive and arrest
In 1993, after completing a 3-year prison sentence, Schiavone disappeared before judges could put him under surveillance. The Schiavone-Bidognetti clan now firmly led the Casalesi clan. After more than five years on the run, he was arrested on 11 July 1998, in his hideout – a secret apartment behind a sliding wall of granite in his Naples villa, equipped with high tech tools. At the time he was considered to be the Camorra’s "number one" fugitive.

He had been living there with his wife and seven children. Schiavone had already been arrested on at least two prior occasions, but each time he was able to avoid a lengthy sentence on legal technicalities. The mayor of Naples, Antonio Bassolino, praised the local police, and said, "the head of one of the most dangerous criminal clans in southern Italy has been arrested." He compared the arrest to that of Sicilian Mafia chief Salvatore Riina in 1993.

Police informers describe him as a charismatic figure with an entrepreneurial mind, not keen on violent action that only creates problems and police attention, instead of business. In his hide out, police found a library dedicated to his idol Napoleon. While on the run, he fathered three of his six children.

Immense wealth
The Casalesi clan gathered immense wealth with skimming of public contracts for the construction of the A1 highway Rome-Naples and the prison in Santa Maria Capua Vetere. Ironically, many of its members ended up in that same prison. They also were active in waste management from the north of Italy in Caserta, and the distribution racket of dairy products by Parmalat and Cirio. Profits were invested in real estate in Parma and Milan.

According to author Roberto Saviano, raised in Casal di Principe, the Schiavone family is immensely rich: "In two legal proceedings against the Schiavone family in August 1996, authorities confiscated 450 billion lire; a year later, they seized another 515 billion. That adds up to US$788 million … from just one of the many families that make up the Casalesi, an amount that would bring any business to its knees. But the Schiavone family and the Casalesi continue to prosper. All told, they are estimated to be worth about US$47 billion." The patrimony is managed by his wife Giuseppina Nappa and his brother Walter.

Life sentence
He was finally sentenced to life on 19 June 2008, after a 10-year trial, named the Spartacus Trial, against 36 members of the Casalesi clan charged with a string of murders and other crimes. Over the course of the first trial and the last appeal, five people involved in the case were murdered, including an interpreter. A judge and two journalists received death threats.

All defendants were found guilty, and 16 will never be released. Schiavone’s lieutenant, Francesco Bidognetti, known as 'Cicciott' 'e Mezzanotte' (Midnight Frankie), was also given life imprisonment. Michele Zagaria, another Casalesi bosses, got the same sentence but was on the run and was included in the list of most wanted fugitives in Italy, until his arrest on 7 December 2011.

References

Allum, Felia Skyle (2000), The Neapolitan Camorra: Crime and politics in post-war Naples (1950-92), Brunel University

External links
 , from 'O sistema' (The System), a documentary by Matteo Scanni, Ruben Holiva (2006) on YouTube

1953 births
Living people
People from the Province of Caserta
Camorristi
Camorristi sentenced to life imprisonment
Casalesi clan
Italian prisoners sentenced to life imprisonment